Arum concinnatum, commonly known as the Crete arum, is a flowering plant species in the family Araceae.

Habitat

Arum concinnatum occurs in a variety of habitats including ditches, wet areas and Olea europaea groves from sea level to 350 meters of altitude. The species occurs from the southern tip of the Peloponnese to south-western Turkey, as well as most eastern Mediterranean islands.

Taxonomy

Within the genus Arum, it belongs to subgenus Arum and section Arum. The species is related to Arum italicum, with which it shares similar horizontally-oriented rhizomatous tubers and hexaploid chromosome counts (2n = 84). 

A. concinnatum is often incorrectly called Arum byzantinum in horticulture. However, the true A. byzantinum is a smaller diploid species from NW Turkey with small, purple spadix appendices.

References

Flora of Europe
Flora of Greece
Flora of Turkey
concinnatum